Klokočov is a village and municipality in Čadca District in the Žilina Region of northern Slovakia.

History
In the village was created in 1954 by the split of the biggest municipality Turzovka into several smaller villages.

Geography
The municipality lies at an altitude of 556 metres and covers an area of 51.171 km². It has a population of about 2610 people.

External links
https://web.archive.org/web/20071006173841/http://www.statistics.sk/mosmis/eng/run.html

Villages and municipalities in Čadca District